The Swift River is a river that begins in Yukon Territory and flows southwest into British Columbia to its mouth at the east side of Teslin Lake on the Teslin River system. The river drains the uppermost portion of the Cassiar Mountains and in its lower reaches traverses the Nisutlin Plateau, which lies along the east side of Teslin Lake north of the mouth of the Jennings River, which is to the south of the Swift.

The river is one of two in British Columbia known as the Swift, the other of the same name is tributary to the Cariboo River in the eastern parts of the region of the same name.

See also
List of rivers of British Columbia
List of rivers of Yukon
Little Rancheria River
Rancheria River
Toozaza Creek

References

Rivers of British Columbia
Rivers of Yukon
Cassiar Country